The Voice of the Turtle is a 1947 romantic comedy film directed by Irving Rapper and starring Ronald Reagan, Eleanor Parker, Eve Arden, and Wayne Morris. It was based on the long-running 1943 stage play The Voice of the Turtle by John Van Druten. In the 1950s, it was re-released and shown on television under the title One for the Book.

Plot
It is December 1944 in New York City. Sally Middleton, a naive young actress, is jilted by her lover, a theatrical producer, for becoming too serious about their relationship. Heartbroken, Sally vows not to let herself fall in love again. Nevertheless, she agrees to a dinner date with Bill Page, an Army sergeant on a weekend pass, after Bill is stood up by her sophisticated friend Olive Lashbrooke.

When Bill has trouble getting a hotel room, he ends up spending the weekend at Sally's apartment, which is considered risque under the social mores of the time. Although Bill and Sally sleep in separate rooms, the arrangement creates awkward situations for Sally, especially when she finds herself developing feelings for Bill.

Olive, having at first set her sights on a Navy officer, has second thoughts and makes a play for Bill. But Bill has fallen for Sally, and eventually convinces her to set aside her fears and start a new romance with him, one that they both hope will end in marriage.

Cast
 Ronald Reagan as Sgt. Bill Page
 Eleanor Parker as Sally Middleton
 Eve Arden as Olive Lashbrooke
 Kent Smith as Kenneth Bartlett
 Wayne Morris as Cmdr. Ned Burling

Box office
According to Warner Bros records the film earned $2,617,000 domestically and $499,000 foreign.

Critical reception 
Many critics compared the film to the original play, which finished its Broadway run one week after the film's release. Time magazine complained, "The movie is most coyly prurient where the play was most pleasantly candid," while The New York Times found the film version more satisfying because it was "morally wholesome and ideally romantic."

See also
 Ronald Reagan films

References

External links
 
 
 

1947 films
1947 romantic comedy films
American black-and-white films
American films based on plays
American romantic comedy films
1940s English-language films
Films directed by Irving Rapper
Films scored by Max Steiner
Films set in 1944
Films set in New York City
Films set on the home front during World War II
Warner Bros. films
1940s American films